Jesse Chabot is a Canadian screenwriter and producer best known for his work on Goon: Last of the Enforcers and Random Acts of Violence.

Career 
Chabot began writing scripts for Goon: Last of the Enforcers (2017) and Random Acts of Violence (2019), both directed by Jay Baruchel. He was hired to co-write the scripts for Exorcism Diaries and Baseballissimo, alongside Baruchel.

Filmography

References

External links 
 

21st-century Canadian comedians
21st-century Canadian male writers
21st-century Canadian screenwriters
Canadian comedy writers
Canadian male screenwriters
Living people
Year of birth missing (living people)